The 1888 St. Louis Browns season was the team's seventh season in St. Louis, Missouri, and its seventh season in the American Association. The Browns went 92–43 during the season and finished first in the American Association, claiming their fourth pennant in a row. In the 1888 World Series, the Browns faced the National League champion New York Giants, losing the series 6 games to 4.

Regular season

Season standings

Record vs. opponents

Roster

Player stats

Batting

Starters by position 
Note: Pos = Position; G = Games played; AB = At bats; H = Hits; Avg. = Batting average; HR = Home runs; RBI = Runs batted in

Other batters 
Note: G = Games played; AB = At bats; H = Hits; Avg. = Batting average; HR = Home runs; RBI = Runs batted in

Pitching

Starting pitchers 
Note: G = Games pitched; IP = Innings pitched; W = Wins; L = Losses; ERA = Earned run average; SO = Strikeouts

Other pitchers 
Note: G = Games pitched; IP = Innings pitched; W = Wins; L = Losses; ERA = Earned run average; SO = Strikeouts

References 
1888 St. Louis Browns at Baseball Reference
1888 St. Louis Browns team page at www.baseball-almanac.com

St. Louis Cardinals seasons
Saint Louis Browns season
St Louis